Highland Park station may refer to:

 Highland Park station (Illinois)
 Highland Park station (Los Angeles)
 Highland Park Police Station, California